Christmas Island is the fifth studio album by Andrew Jackson Jihad, released by SideOneDummy Records on May 6, 2014. It was produced by John Congleton. It marks the group's departure from their original folk punk sound, and is their first album as a 5-piece. It is the last album to be released by the band under their original name, Andrew Jackson Jihad.

Track listing

Personnel

Andrew Jackson Jihad
Sean Bonnette - lead vocals, rhythm guitar
Ben Gallaty - bass guitar, double bass, backing vocals, marimba, bells
Preston Bryant - piano, lead guitar, backing vocals, harpsichord, mellotron, waterphone, organ, synthesizer
Mark Glick - cello
Deacon Batchelor - drums, percussion, surdo

Additional Personnel
Jamie Stewart - vocals on "Coffin Dance"
John Congleton - producer
Alex Bhore - engineer
Alan Douches - mastering
Suzanne Falk - artwork
Jeff Rosenstock - layout

Charts

References

2014 albums
AJJ (band) albums
SideOneDummy Records albums